¡Ay Güey! is a Mexican comedy series that premiered on Blim on 24 December 2017 and is produced by Rodolfo de Anda. It stars Alejandra Ambrosi and Vanessa Terkes. The series follows two women who are not friends, don't like each other and work in different things, but for situations in life they find a suitcase with 10 million dollars.

Plot 
Susana (Alejandra Ambrosi) and Verónica (Vanessa Terkes) are two women who unexpectedly trip over a suitcase that contains 10 million dollars, and from that moment they are immersed in a singular flight, to escape from the thugs that pursue them to recover their money. In that escape, Susana and Verónica are confused with two rich heiresses, which will confront them to a world completely unknown to them.

Cast 
 Alejandra Ambrosi as Susana
 Vanessa Terkes as Verónica
 Diana Bracho as Sra. Beatriz Rothstein
 Salvador Zerboni as Pepe De La Peña
 María Adelaida Puerta as Kiki De Los Monteros
 Leonardo García as Óscar
 Raúl Román as Rolando
 Salvador Pineda as Don Chuy
 Ramón Medina as Carmelo
 Gabiela Zas as July
 Mario Escalante as El Boiler
 Esteban Franco as Comandante Bermúdez

Production 
Production of the series began in September 2016. Filming took place in Acapulco and lasted for four months.

Episodes

See also
Güey

References

External links 

Blim TV original programming
2017 Mexican television series debuts
Television series by Televisa
2010s Mexican comedy television series
Spanish-language television shows